The Jimi Hendrix Concerts is a posthumous live album by Jimi Hendrix, released in 1982. The album contains eleven songs from six different concerts between 1968 and 1970.

The album spent eleven weeks in the UK Albums Chart, peaking at number 16. In the United States, it was less successful, reaching number 79 in the Billboard 200.

The 1989 re-release of the album on compact disc included a previously unreleased 12th track, "Foxey Lady".

Track listing

Personnel
 Jimi Hendrix – guitar, vocals
 Mitch Mitchell – drums
 Noel Redding – bass guitar (all tracks except "Red House" & "Hey Joe")
 Billy Cox – bass guitar ("Red House" & "Hey Joe")

References

1982 live albums
Jimi Hendrix live albums
Live albums published posthumously
Albums produced by Alan Douglas (record producer)
Reprise Records live albums